Senate elections were held in South Vietnam on 30 August 1970. The election was contested by a total of 16 lists, of which the three highest polling would be elected and receive 10 seats each. Each voter had three votes, with the winning list receiving 1,149,597 votes (11.7%), whilst the third-placed list won 882,274 votes (9.0%). Voter turnout was reported to be 65.4%.

Results

References

South Vietnam
Elections in South Vietnam
Senate election
August 1970 events in Asia
Election and referendum articles with incomplete results